Southern Tomb 25 is a sepulchre in Amarna, Egypt. It was intended for the burial of Ay, who later became Pharaoh, after the 18th Dynasty king Tutankhamun. The grave was never finished, and Ay was later interred in the Western Valley of the Valley of the Kings (tomb WV23), in Thebes.

The tomb was only partially carved from the rock, with the first part of the pillared hall approaching completion. It contains depictions of Ay receiving rewards from Akhenaten and Nefertiti.

The sepulchre also contains a version of the Great Hymn to the Aten.

Amarna tombs
Ay